Chatzis is a village in the municipal unit of Aigio, Achaea, Greece. It is located 6 km southwest of Aigio town. Chatzis had a population of 51 in 2011. Chatzis suffered damage from the 2007 Greek forest fires.

Population

See also
List of settlements in Achaea

References

External links
 Chatzi GTP Travel Pages

Aigialeia
Aigio
Populated places in Achaea